Edith Berkeley (1 September 1875–25 February 1963) was a Canadian marine biologist who specialized in the biology of polychaetes. The Edith Berkeley Memorial Lectures were established in the University of British Columbia in her memory in 1969.

Edith was born in Tulbagh, Cape Colony to a bridge engineer Alfred Dunington and his wife Martha Treglohan. Edith studied at Wimbledon High School and completed a pre-medical course at the University of London, where she attended on scholarship. After passing the examination for the bachelor of medicine degree in 1897 she took an interest in chemistry and zoology, working under Professor Weldon who worked on polychaetes and Morris Travers in the William Ramsay Laboratory.

In 1918, she gave up a paid position as zoology assistant at Columbia University to work as a volunteer for the Pacific Biological Station at Nanaimo in British Columbia Canada.  As a volunteer she would be able to perform field work, whereas in a paid position, her work would be included under her husband's name. Though she was never officially on staff, her research on polychaetes brought prestige to the Station and established her as a world authority on the subject.  It was in the chemistry lab of Travers that she met Cyril J. Bergtheil who later changed his name to Cyril J. Berkeley. Berkeley obtained a posting as Imperial Bacteriologist in India in 1902. They married on February 26, 1902 and moved to India where they lived for ten years. 

Her husband Cyril Berkeley left his own research to help her in 1930. They wrote 34 papers together, and she published an additional 12 in her own name. Many organisms have been named after them. Their daughter Alfreda Berkeley Needler (1903-1951) also became a zoologist as did Alfreda's daughter Mary Needler Arai (1932 – 2017). Edith died in Nanaimo, British Columbia.

References 

1875 births
1963 deaths
Canadian marine biologists
British people in Cape Colony
British emigrants to Canada